2nd OTO Awards

Reduta, Bratislava, Slovakia

Overall winner  Jarmila Hargašová

Hall of Fame  Katarína Kolníková

◄ 1st | 3rd ►

The 2nd OTO Awards, honoring the best in Slovak popular culture for the year 2001, took time and place on February 2, 2002, at Reduta, a Slovak Philharmonic concert hall in Bratislava. As with the first edition of the show, the ceremony broadcast live by STV was hosted by Tibor Hlista.

Presenters

 Andrea Bugošová, TV presenter
 Jozef Golonka, ice hockey coach
 Juraj Jakubisko, film director
 Jarmila Košťová, TV announcer
 Mária Kráľovičová, actress
 Milan Materák, STV managing director
 Eva Máziková, singer
 Bolek Polívka, actor-mime
 Stanislav Ruman, TV Komplet chief editor 
 Kristína Svarinská, child actress
 Stanislav Ščepka, theatre artist
 Miroslav Žbirka, musician

Performers
 Petr Muk, singer
 Bolek Polívka and The Backwards, band
 Andrea Zimányiová, singer

Winners and nominees

Main categories
 Television

 Music

Others

References

External links
 Archive > OTO 2001 – 2nd edition  (Official website)
 OTO 2001 – 2nd edition (Official website - old)

02
2001 in Slovak television
2001 in Slovak music
2001 television awards